Cibinong is a district in Bogor Regency, West Java, Indonesia which serves as the Regency's capital.  Cibinong District had 363,424 inhabitants at the 2020 Census.

The Science Center of Indonesian Institute of Sciences (Lembaga Ilmu Pengetahuan Indonesia) is located in the district. Cibinong contains a swamp forest, which is already mentioned by van Steenis in 1933, called Rawa (Swamp) Siradayah, and it still preserved until present time.

Cuisine specialities of Cibinong include laksa cibinong and Mie ayam (Chicken noodles) due to the strong influence of Chinese community. Laksa is a spicy noodle soup from the Peranakan culture. Laksa Cibinong is a kind of thick yellowish coconut milk based soup, produced by a mixture of some spices, and it is served with bean sprout, rice vermicelli (bihun), hard-boiled eggs, cooked shredded chicken, fried shallots and Indonesian lemon-basil leaves. Sometime they are also served with rice cake (lontong). Mie ayam is easily found everywhere, as a cheap food for factory workers and school students. There are basically two preparation styles, one is more Indonesian in style (with Indonesian spices, sweet soy sauce, saos sambel), and the other one is more Chinese (using for example star anise, sesame oil or soy sauce). Most of the places offers, in addition to noddle, kwetiau or bihun.

Chinese Peranakan culture can be seen at the Chinese Temple Ho Tek Bio near Cibinong market, during Imlek or Chinese New Year. Near the market, in front of the lake, there is a Chinese cemetery compound (Sentiong).

Administrative divisions
Cibinong district is divided into 13 administrative villages which are as follows:

Cibinong
Cirimekar
Ciriung
Harapan Jaya
Karadenan
Nanggewer
Nanggewer Mekar
Pabuaran
Pabuaran Mekar
Pakansari
Pondok Rajeg
Sukahati
Tengah

Climate
Cibinong has a tropical rainforest climate (Af) with heavy to very heavy rainfall year-round.

References

External links

 Pictures of Rawa Siradayah 

Districts of Bogor Regency
Populated places in West Java
Regency seats of West Java